Michael Prosser (born 1966) is a Welsh international lawn bowler.

Bowls career
In 2007 he won the triples gold medal at the Atlantic Bowls Championships

He is a Welsh champion winning the 2000 pairs at the Welsh National Bowls Championships and was Welsh Indoor Singles Champion in 2001.

Personal life
He is a HM Revenue and Customs operations manager by trade.

References

Living people
1966 births
Welsh male bowls players